Guan Xin (born 24 January 1987) is a basketball player for the China women's national basketball team. She was part of the squad for the 2012 Summer Olympics.

References

1987 births
Living people
Chinese women's basketball players
Basketball players at the 2012 Summer Olympics
Olympic basketball players of China
Basketball players from Changchun
Shanxi Flame players
Asian Games medalists in basketball
Basketball players at the 2010 Asian Games
Asian Games gold medalists for China
Medalists at the 2010 Asian Games
Chinese expatriate basketball people in Poland
Guangdong Vermilion Birds players
Manchu sportspeople
Power forwards (basketball)